is the 27th single by Japanese singer Yōko Oginome. Written by Yumi Yoshimoto and Nao Asada, the single was released on May 21, 1993, by Victor Entertainment.

Background and release
The song was used as the ending theme song of the Fuji TV children's variety show , featuring Hidetō Tajima as Ugo Ugo-kun and Yuka Koide as Lhuga-chan on backing vocals. Oginome was also a regular in the show as Planet-chan.

"Yumemiru Planet" peaked at No. 33 on Oricon's singles chart and sold over 47,000 copies.

Track listing

Charts

References

External links

1993 singles
Yōko Oginome songs
Japanese-language songs
Victor Entertainment singles